Agathistoma nordestinum is a species of sea snail, a marine gastropod mollusk in the family Tegulidae. It is endemic to Brazil, and is known to occur in the northeastern region of the country.

Distribution
Agathistoma nordestinum occurs in northeastern Brazil, from the state of Maranhão to Bahia, and is usually found between rocks at 1–2 meters during the low tide.

Description and etymology
The shell of this species has five whorls and attains 13 mm in height, with a maximum width of 10 mm. It is globose, with a rounded profile between the spire and base and has a marked keel forming a slight shoulder. It is coloured yellow cream at the base, with axially aligned irregular dark brownish or light brown blotches. The specific epithet nordestinum is a reference to Northeast Brazil. In Portuguese, people born in this region are called nordestinos.

References

nordestinum
Gastropods described in 2022